Wilner v. NSA, 592 F.3d 60 (2d Cir. 2009), was a Freedom of Information Act lawsuit filed by Thomas Wilner and fifteen other lawyers who represented Guantanamo captives against the United States National Security Agency.

The lawyers argued that the NSA, through its warrantless wiretap program, had violated their attorney-client privilege.
They referred to the January 18, 2006 lawsuit CCR v. Bush, and called the NSA's response "inadequate".  They assert that while the Government had released 85 pages of documents they had withheld another 85 that the law obliged them to release.

The other lawyers participating in the suit are:

References

External links
 

2009 in United States case law
Guantanamo Bay captives legal and administrative procedures
National Security Agency
Telephone tapping
United States attorney–client privilege case law
United States Court of Appeals for the Second Circuit cases
United States District Court for the Southern District of New York cases